Sorghum macrospermum, the Katherine sorghum, is a species of flowering plant in the family Poaceae, endemic only to limestone outcrops in the Katherine River area of the Northern Territory of Australia. An annual and a diploid, as a crop wild relative of Sorghum bicolor it is being studied for its resistance to various pest species.

References

macrospermum
Endemic flora of Australia
Flora of the Northern Territory
Plants described in 1950